The Bruhat Bengaluru Mahanagara Palike (BBMP) is the administrative body responsible for civic amenities and some infrastructural assets of the Greater Bengaluru metropolitan area. It is the fourth largest Municipal Corporation in India and is responsible for a population of 8.4 million in an area of 741 km2. Its boundaries have expanded more than 10 times over the last six decades.

Its roles and responsibilities include the "orderly development of the city" — zoning and building regulations, health, hygiene, licensing, trade and education, as well as quality of life issues such as public open space, water bodies, parks and greenery.

The BBMP represents the third level of government (the Central Government and State Government being the first two levels). BBMP is run by a city council composed of elected representatives, called "corporators", one from each of the wards (localities) of the city.

The elections to the council are held once every five years, with results being decided by popular vote. The members contesting elections to the council represent one or more of the state's political parties.

History 
The history of municipal governance of Bangalore dates back to 27 March 1862, when nine leading citizens of the old city formed a Municipal Board under the Improvement of Towns Act of 1850 with a similar Municipal Board formed for the newer Cantonment area. The two boards were legalised in 1881, and functioned as two independent bodies called Bangalore City Municipality and Bangalore Civil and Military Station Municipality (Cantonment).  The following year, half of the municipal councillors were permitted to be elected, property tax was introduced and greater powers given over police and local improvement.

In 1913 an honorary president was introduced, and seven years later made an elected position. An appointed Municipal Commissioner was introduced in 1926 on the Cantonment board as the executive authority.

After Indian independence, the two Municipal Boards were merged to form the Corporation of the City of Bangalore in 1949, under the Bangalore City Corporation Act. The corporation then consisted of 70 elected representatives and 50 electoral divisions and the office of Mayor introduced for the first time. The first elections were held in 1950.

The name of the council changed — first to Bangalore City Corporation (BCC) and then to Bengaluru Mahanagara Palike (BMP).

In 1989, the BMP expanded to include 87 wards and further increased to 100 wards in 1995, covering an extra area of 75 sq. km. The council also included 40 additional members drawn from the parliament and the state legislature.

Around the same time, the BMP council passed a resolution that only BDA layouts should be included in its limits and not revenue pockets, because of the cost of developing the latter. Around 50 per cent of the expanded BMP areas (meaning at least 40 wards among 100) were revenue pockets at that time. At that time, the BMP proposed betterment charges of Rs.215/sq. yard based on costs of developing those areas. But after the BMP elections of 1996, the council took a decision to reduce betterment charges to Rs.100/sq. yard. The state government (the H. D. Deve Gowda led administration) then issued a notice to the city council demanding why the latter reduced the rates. Subsequently, the state government agreed to the BMP rates.

In November 2006, the BMP Council was dissolved by the state government upon the completion of its five-year term. In January 2007, the Karnataka Government issued a notification to merge 100 wards of the erstwhile Bengaluru Mahanagara Palike with seven City Municipal Councils (CMC)s, one Town Municipal Council (TMC) and 110 villages around the city to form a single administrative area  (111 villages mentioned in initial Notification. Later 2 villages omitted from the list and another village added before final Notification). The process was completed by April 2007 and the body was renamed 'Bruhat Bengaluru Mahanagara Palike (Greater Bangalore Municipal Corporation).

The first elections to the newly created BBMP body were held on 28 March 2010, after the delays due to the delimitation of wards and finalising voter lists.

The second elections were held on 22 August 2015 with the BJP winning the majority with 101 Corporators (Congress won 76, Janatha Dal S 14 and Independents 7). The results were declared on 25 August 2015. With none of the parties touching the required number, the Congress and JDS with the help of independents won the mayor election. The BJP with the majority number of corporators in the BBMP council was forced to sit in the Opposition. 
On 11 September 2015, B.N. Manjunatha Reddy of the INC was elected Mayor, Hemalatha Gopalaiah of the JD(S) was elected Deputy Mayor and Padmanabha Reddy of the BJP was elected the Leader of Opposition.

Elections were held in Mar–April 2010 after a period of Commissioner's rule for the BBMP corporators and a Mayor S. K. Nataraj was chosen.

Fresh elections were held in August 2015.

In 2015 the INC passed a legislation in the state parliament requiring the abolition of the BBMP, and its reconstitution as multiple, separate municipal bodies. The government's rationale, as stated in the bill itself, was that the population of Bangalore was too large for a single corporation to administer. The bill recommended that the BBMP be split into three separate municipal corporations ("trifurcation"), but stated the actual number was to be specified by government notification at a later date. The bill was strongly opposed by the opposition in the state parliament and a majority of the BBMP councillors. It was also debated in the media. Commentators noted that the bill takes place against the failure of municipal trifurcation in Delhi three years earlier.

In July 2016, the Union Government's Ministry of Home Affairs raised 13 objections to the bill, and sent a request for further explanation to the Karnataka Government, in particular raising the point that an elected body cannot be dissolved before its term ends, leaving the BBMP intact until at least 2019. It also advised Karnataka to study the consequences of the Delhi trifurcation as it may relate to Bangalore. After holding off on implementing the split for several years, in October 2017, Karnataka Chief Minister Siddaramaiah reaffirmed his objective of carrying out the trifurcation.

The Karnataka Legislative Assembly passed the Karnataka Municipal Corporation (Amendment) Bill to increase the number of civic wards in Bengaluru to 250. On 6 October 2020 a legislative select committee led by BJP MLA S Raghu decided to increase the number of civic wards from 198 to 243, Chief Minister B. S. Yediyurappa approved creating 243 wards. Delimitation Commission, headed by BBMP Commissioner Manjunath Prasad, was set up to decide on how to divide the city into 243 wards. The Delimitation Commission consists of Bengaluru Urban Deputy Commissioner, BDA (Bangalore Development Authority) Chairman and BBMP Special Commissioner Revenue (all IAS officers) as its members.

On 10 December 2020, the B. S. Yediyurappa government passed the Bruhat Bengaluru Mahanagara Palike (BBMP) Bill, 2020 in the Karnataka legislature. The BBMP Act will govern the municipal corporation. Various changes to the BBMP’s structure was incorporated in the new Act. The BBMP Act increased the term length for the mayor and the deputy mayor to five years from one year. It also increased the number of zones from eight to fifteen. All fifteen zones would be headed by a zonal commissioner who reports to the BBMP’s chief commissioner. The Act also forms constituency consultative committees (headed by the local MLA, consisting of councillors and resident association members) and zonal committees to monitor the implementation of projects and address public grievances.

History of electoral results

Structure 

A mayor and deputy mayor of the council are also elected for a period of 30 months, though not by popular vote. The post of the mayor and deputy mayor are filled through a quota system to a Scheduled Castes and Tribes candidate or to an Other Backward Class female candidate from among the elected Councillors .
However, in the absence of an elected body, the BBMP is at present run by an Administrator and a Commissioner, who is appointed by the State Government. The Additional Commissioner is a specially appointed IRS officer. The Bruhat Bangalore Mahanagara Palike is responsible for the civic and infrastructural requirements of the city. It often works in conjunction with other civic bodies such as the Agenda for Bangalore Infrastructure Development Task Force (ABIDE) and the Bangalore Development Authority (BDA) to design and implement civic and infrastructural projects.

Zones 

BBMP is divided into 8 zones, for the ease of administration each administered by a Zonal Commissioner:

 Yelahanka Zone
 Dasarahalli Zone
 Rajarajeshwarinagar Zone
 Bommanahalli Zone
 South Zone
 West Zone
 East Zone
 Mahadevapura Zone

As per the BS Patil headed BBMP Restructuring Committee, BBMP is poised to be restructured into 5 smaller palikes functioning under Greater Bengaluru Authority. 
The present Gandhinagar zone as Central BMP, Dasarahalli, RR Nagar & Vijaynagar zones as West BMP, Yelahanka and Malleshwaram zones as North BMP, Sarvagnanagar & Mahadevapura as East BMP and finally Jayanagar & Bommanahalli zones as South BMP. 
Every zone has a Joint Commissioner, who is answerable to the BBMP commissioner. The decentralization hasn't been very effective in addressing the problems in administration. The end of 2013 saw discussions in various circles about dividing BBMP into more parts.
Therefore, once President's approval to the BBMP Restructuring is accorded, BBMP is to be split into 5 municipal corporations with 400 wards (80 each) and the current BBMP headquarters at NR Square becoming headquarters for the Greater Bengaluru Authority (GBA) with five Mahanagara Palikes under it.
The GBA will have a Metropolitan Commissioner (IAS rank – higher administrative grade) and a directly elected Metropolitan Mayor (on the likes of London) with 5-year term.
Each palikes too will have a Mayor for 5 years.

As per Urban Development Department, 
Yalahanka and Malleshwara zones will form North Bengaluru Mahanagara Palike, Gandhinagara zone into Central Bengaluru Mahanagara Palike, Dasarahalli, Rajarajeshwari Nagara & Vijayanagara as West Bengaluru Mahanagara Palike, Jayanagara & Bommanahalli as South Bengaluru Mahanagara Palike and Sarvagnanagara & Mahadevapura as East Bengaluru Mahanagara Palike.
This move will lead to better civic management, higher power and accountability, greater accessibility to citizens, solve logistical issues, higher tax compliance etc.

Income and expenditure 

The BBMP raises more than half if its annual income from the collection of property tax, a third from State government grants nd the remainder received in Central government grants, direct service fees, licences (advertising hoardings) and rent from municipal owned property.

Role of the BBMP

Property tax collection 
A shift to a unit area self assessment method of property tax collection in Bangalore was successful, leading to a sharp rise in tax collection revenues. Phase one of the reforms starting in 2000 led to a 33 per cent increase in tax revenues, whilst a second phase initiated in 2007 led to a 74 per cent increase the following year.

Roads and infrastructure 
Bangalore contains approximately 1,920 km of arterial and sub-arterial roads. Roads are badly constructed, full of potholes and frequently dug up and re-laid. The Deccan Herald describes an "unholy nexus of corporators and contractors [...] benefiting from the lucrative business of filling potholes, relaying and asphalting roads annually".

The BBMP came under criticism in 2005 from Information Technology companies for failing to effectively address the crumbling road and traffic infrastructure of the city.

In July 2005, the Karnataka High Court castigated the BBMP for failing to maintain roads in good condition.

The BBMP's contracting system for the city's roads are reported to operate under a corrupt commission system. When work is tendered and the bid won by a contractor, a percentage (perhaps up to 20%) is paid to the area corporator, MLA and BBMP council.

In 2015, artist Nanjundaswamy installed a life-size crocodile as a form of protest against 'killer' potholes. This was followed a month later with the installation of a giant anaconda.

TenderSURE 

In 2011, the Jana Urban Space Foundation published a document called TenderSURE (Specification for Urban Roads Execution) which contained detailed guidelines for the design, specifications and procurement contracts needed to bring India's road infrastructure up to an international standard within the Indian context. The purpose of these guidelines was to enable the construction of urban roads that were designed for all road users (cars, buses, autos, bikes, pedestrians, street carts), that integrated all existing networked services (water, sewerage, power, OFC, gas and drainage) with provision for the future, and that would integrate the civic agencies to prevent roads being repeatedly re-dug and relaid. The ultimate objective was to give roads a lifespan of 10 years, instead of the existing one or two.

In 2012, the Government of Karnataka made budget allocations for 20 pilot roads to be implemented by the BBMP. The first of these roads, including St Marks and Museum Road, where completed in June 2015. Another 50 roads were sanctioned by the Government in the same year. In 2017, St Marks Road became a case study for the Global Designing Cities Initiative's Global Urban Streets Guide, making it the only model street selected from India.

Stormwater drains 
The BBMP reports that it administers 741 kilometres of storm water drains and another 1,500 km of secondary drains. A large percentage of the Rs 600 crores allocated to the BBMP under the JnNURM scheme for repairs and upgrades of the city's storm water drains is reported to have been siphoned off, leading to a reduction in such funding from the central government.

Garbage disposal 

Bangalore's waste volumes have grown strongly since 1990 and the BBMP has come under ongoing criticism for its mismanagement of the city's garbage disposal system, particularly throughout 2012–13 when Bangalore was routinely referred to as "Garbage City". Following the closure of Bangalore's two landfill sites in mid-2012 by the Karnataka State Pollution Control Board, the BBMP was left without any plan or alternative strategy for disposing of city's 3-4000 tons of daily waste. Garbage worker strikes and High Court rulings requiring the implementation of the Municipal Solid Waste Management Rules 2001 exacerbated the crisis whilst garbage accumulated on every street. The crisis abated somewhat from 2014.

A 2017 enquiry found no serious scrutiny of waste contractors, with the BBMP reimbursing contractors for around 200 crore in fake bills.

As of 2018, seven waste processing plants are reported to be operating at only one third of their capacity.

Public open space 

Bangalore contains more than 416 neighbourhood parks. Current Karnataka legislation requires 15% of residential layouts to be retained for public open space, and an additional 10% for civic amenities. However, within the area of the BBMP one study estimated that only 8.4% of the urban area is parkland whilst the 2003 Bangalore Master Plan allocated only 2.01 sq m of green space per citizen, 6.99 sq m less than the minimum recommendation of the World Health Organisation. By way of comparison, the 'Urban Green Guidelines, 2014' issued by the Government of India calculates the average green space for cities worldwide at 18.6% and Bangalore's area of green space at less than 5%. Bangalore compares unfavourably with New Delhi, which has retained 20% of its urban area as public open space. It also demonstrates a significant deterioration since the 1960, when open space represented 17.2% of the total area.

Tree planting 

The BBMP's responsibilities include planting and maintaining street trees. The BBMP has embarked upon numerous tree planting schemes over many decades and with varying levels of success. The most notable period of planting is held to be the period of 1982 and 1987 when Chief Minister R Gundu Rao appointed forest officer S G Neginahal to green the streets of Bangalore with more than 15 lakh trees. His systematic plantation program involved the establishment of new nurseries, the installation of tree guards, a five-year monitoring program and the replacement of any failed plantings. The reported success rate was 97% and most of the mature trees along Bangalore's major avenues date to this era.

More recently the BBMP has reported that between 2007 and 2013 more than 10 lakh trees have been planted with a survival rate of 64.5%. These numbers have been contested by civic agencies and citizen groups as inaccurate. The Bangalore-based Environmental Support Group did a ground survey to calculate a survival rate of 20 – 25%, assuming the trees were even planted at all whilst urban conservationist Vijay Nishanth estimates a survival rate of 10%. The BBMP places responsibility for this with the lack experience of their contractors. Contractors in turn blame the BBMP for failure to release funds and allocating sapling locations in places with no water or suitable growing conditions.

In 2017 the High Court of Karnataka directed the BBMP to plant an additional 10 lakh street trees and to form greening committees comprising activists and experts, and tree wardens. To comply with this directive the BBMP launched an app called 'BBMP Green' allowing residents to collect free saplings and plant them on their own streets. Activists criticised the program for essentially absolving the BBMP of the responsibility to maintain street trees within the city.

The BBMP's tree planting activities contrast unfavourably with the Forestry Department who plants half the number of trees per year at a lower cost and a reportedly 95% survival rate.

None of the BBMP's replanting schemes have compensated for the ongoing removal of existing trees within the city, both from private property and the destruction of previously planted street trees for street widening purposes. A 2010 study found the density of trees in Bangalore to be lower than many other Asian cities with an estimated 50,000 trees lost between the date of publication and 2016.

See also 
 Karnataka
 Kempegowda Award
 Municipal corporation

References

External links 

Bruhat Bangalore Mahanagara Palike
BBMP trifurcation: What will it mean for citizens? Will it work? 
BBMP schools and colleges see record rise in admissions

Municipal corporations in Karnataka
1862 establishments in Kingdom of Mysore
Government of Bangalore
Bangalore Urban district